Zuénoula is a town in central Ivory Coast. It is a sub-prefecture of and the seat of Zuénoula Department in Marahoué Region, Sassandra-Marahoué District. Zuénoula is also a commune.

In 2021, the population of the sub-prefecture of Zuénoula was 78,613.

Villages
The 36 villages of the sub-prefecture of Zuénoula and their population in 2014 are:

Notes

Sub-prefectures of Marahoué
Communes of Marahoué